Saint-Gorgon is a commune in the Vosges department in Grand Est in northeastern France.

Geography 
The river Mortagne forms part of the commune's northern border.

See also 
 Communes of the Vosges department

References 

Communes of Vosges (department)